René Blum (17 February 1889 – 25 December 1967) was a Luxembourgish politician, diplomat, and jurist.  He sat in the Chamber of Deputies from 1918 until 1937, when he became a government minister.  He was briefly the President of the Chamber, from 1925 until 1926.

In government, Blum held the offices of Minister for Justice and Minister for Transport, before the outbreak of the Second World War cut these tenures short.  After the war, Blum served as the Ambassador to the Soviet Union (1944–55). During his time as the Justice Minister, Blum allowed a refugee from Germany to stay in the country until he was able to make it safely out of Europe.

|-

|-

|-

Ministers for Justice of Luxembourg
Ministers for Public Works of Luxembourg
Ministers for Transport of Luxembourg
Presidents of the Chamber of Deputies (Luxembourg)
Members of the Chamber of Deputies (Luxembourg)
Luxembourgian politicians
Luxembourgian diplomats
20th-century Luxembourgian lawyers
1889 births
1967 deaths
People from Esch-sur-Alzette
Ambassadors of Luxembourg to the Soviet Union